Efogi Airport is an airfield serving Efogi, in the Central Province of Papua New Guinea.

References

External links
 

Airports in Papua New Guinea
Central Province (Papua New Guinea)